Mordellistena albocapillata is a species of beetle in the genus Mordellistena of the family Mordellidae. It was discovered in 1965.

References

albocapillata
Beetles described in 1965